

See also
List of ambassadors to Belgium

Ambassador
 
Belgium